Harvey Mudd College (HMC) is a private college in Claremont, California, focused on science and engineering. It is part of the Claremont Colleges, which share adjoining campus grounds and resources. The college enrolls 902 undergraduate students , and awards the Bachelor of Science degree. Admission to Harvey Mudd is highly competitive. The school has an intense academic culture.

The college was funded by the friends and family of Harvey Seeley Mudd, one of the initial investors in the Cyprus Mines Corporation. Although involved in planning of the new institution, Mudd died before it opened in 1955. The campus was designed by Edward Durell Stone in a modernist style.

History

Harvey Mudd College was founded in 1955. Classes began in 1957, with a founding class of 48 students and one building–Mildred E. Mudd Hall, a dormitory. Classes and meals took place at CMC, and labs in the Baxter Science Building until additional buildings could be built: Jacobs Science Building (1959), Thomas-Garett Hall (1961) and Platt Campus Center (1963). By 1966, the campus had grown to 283 students and 43 faculty.

Under the presidency of Maria Klawe, begun in 2006, Harvey Mudd became a leading advocate for women in STEM in higher education.

In April 2017, all classes were canceled for two days in response to tensions on campus over workload, race issues, and mistrust of faculty. Contributing events included the deaths of two Mudd students and a Scripps student that year and the leak of a report on teaching, learning, and workload at Mudd.

Beginning July 1, 2023, Harriet Nembhard will serve as the sixth President of Harvey Mudd College.

Campus

The original buildings of the campus, designed by Edward Durell Stone and completed in 1959, feature "knobbly concrete squares that students of Harvey Mudd affectionately call 'warts' and use as hooks for skateboards." The school's unofficial mascot "Wally Wart" is an anthropomorphic concrete wart.

In 2013, Travel and Leisure named the college as one of "America's ugliest college campuses" and noted that while Stone regarded his design as a "Modernist masterpiece" the result was "layering drab, slab-sided buildings with Beaux-Arts decoration."

Academic buildings 
The official names for the academic buildings of Harvey Mudd College are:

 F.W. Olin Science Center
 Parsons Engineering Building
 R. Michael Shanahan Center for Teaching and Learning
 Jacobs Science Center
 W.M. Keck Laboratories
 Scott A. McGregor Computer Science Center

Dormitories

The official names for the dormitories of Harvey Mudd College are (listed in order of construction):
 Mildred E. Mudd Hall ("East") - 1957
 West Hall ("West") - 1958
 North Hall ("North") - 1959
 Marks Residence Hall ("South") - 1968
 J. L. Atwood Residence Hall ("Atwood") - 1981
 Case Residence Hall ("Case") - 1985
 Ronald and Maxine Linde Residence Hall ("Linde") - 1993
 Frederick and Susan Sontag Residence Hall ("Sontag") - 2004
 Wayne and Julie Drinkward Residence Hall ("Drinkward") - 2015

Until the addition of the Linde and Sontag dorms, Atwood and Case dorms were occasionally referred to as New Dorm and New Dorm II; Mildred E. Mudd Hall and Marks Hall are almost invariably referred to as East dorm and South dorm.

During the construction of Case Dorm some students decided as a prank to move all of the survey stakes exactly six inches in one direction.

"East" was the first dorm, but it wasn't until "West" was built west of it that it was actually referred to as "East". Then "North" was built, directly north of "East". When the fourth dorm (Marks) was built, there was one corner of the quad available (the northwest) and one directional name, "South", remaining. To this day "South" dorm is the northernmost HMC dorm.

The fifth, sixth, seventh, eighth, and ninth dorms built are Atwood, Case, Linde, Sontag, and Drinkward, respectively. They were initially referred to as "the colonies" by some students, a reference to the fact that they were newer and at the farthest end of the campus; these dorms are now more commonly referred to as "the outer dorms." The college had initially purchased an apartment building adjacent to the newer dorms to house additional students, but it was demolished to make room for Sontag.

Since any HMC student, regardless of class year, can live in any of the dormitories, several of the dorms have accumulated long-standing traditions and so-called 'personalities'.

Academics

HMC offers four-year degrees in chemistry, mathematics, physics, computer science, biology, and engineering, interdisciplinary degrees in mathematical and computational biology, and joint majors in computer science and mathematics; physics and mathematics; or biology and chemistry. Students may also elect an Individual Program of Study (IPS) or an off-campus major offered by any of the other Claremont Colleges, provided one also completes a minor in one of the technical fields that Harvey Mudd offers as a major.

All HMC students are required to take the college's Common Core Curriculum, typically throughout their freshman and sophomore years. This includes courses in computer science, engineering, biology, chemistry, physics, mathematics, writing, a critical inquiry course, and a social impact course.

Its most popular majors, by 2022 graduates, were:
Computer Science & Mathematics (55)
Engineering (51)
Computer Science (49)
Mathematics (18)

In 2018, the Chronicle of Higher Education reported that, in response to student "complaints first to mental-health counselors and then to outside evaluators", the college was "considering how to ease pressure on students without sacrificing rigor."

Admissions 

For the class of 2026, the college received 4,440 applications and admitted 593 applicants (a 13.4% acceptance rate). Of the 237 freshmen who enrolled, the middle 50% of SAT scores reported were 760–790 in mathematics and 720–770 in reading and writing, while the ACT Composite range was 34–36.

Harvey Mudd, along with Wake Forest University, long held out as the last four-year colleges or universities in the U.S. to accept only SAT and not ACT test scores for admission. In August 2007, at the beginning of the application process for the class of 2012, HMC began accepting ACT results, a year after Wake Forest abandoned its former SAT-only policy.

Due to the COVID-19 pandemic, Harvey Mudd waived the requirement for SAT or ACT scores for the graduating classes of 2021 or 2022. This policy was extended to the classes of 2023 and 2024.

Rankings

Washington Monthly ranked Harvey Mudd fifth in 2020 among 218 liberal arts colleges in the U.S. based on its contribution to the public good, as measured by social mobility, research, and promoting public service. Money magazine ranked Harvey Mudd 136th out of 744 in its "Best Colleges For Your Money 2019" report.

In U.S. News & World Report 2021 "America's Best Colleges" report, Harvey Mudd College is tied for the 25th best U.S. liberal arts college, is second among undergraduate engineering schools in the U.S. whose highest degree is a Master's, and is ranked as tied for sixth "Most Innovative School" among 50 liberal arts colleges evaluated.  Forbes in 2019 rated it 23rd in its "America's Top Colleges" ranking of 650 military academies, national universities and liberal arts colleges.

Tuition and other costs
In 2021, Harvey Mudd's total annual cost of attendance (tuition, fees, and room and board) was $82,236. About 70% of freshmen receive financial aid.

Athletics

Athletes from Harvey Mudd compete alongside athletes from Claremont McKenna College and Scripps College as the Claremont-Mudd-Scripps Stags and Athenas (CMS). The teams participate in NCAA Division III in the Southern California Intercollegiate Athletic Conference (SCIAC). The mascot for the men's teams is Stanley the Stag, and the women's teams are the Athenas. Their colors are cardinal and gold.

Athletics history
According to the Division III Fall Learfield Director's Cup Standings for the 2016-2017 year, CMS ranks 12th among all Division III programs, and first among SCIAC colleges.

Sports
There are 21 men's and women's teams.

Men's sports

 Baseball
 Basketball
 Cross Country
 Football
 Golf

 Soccer
 Swimming and Diving
 Tennis
 Track and Field
 Water Polo

Women's sports

Basketball
Cross Country
Golf
Lacrosse
Soccer
Softball

Swimming and Diving
Tennis
Track and Field
Volleyball
Water Polo

Athletic facilities

 Baseball — Bill Arce Field
 Basketball and Volleyball — Roberts Pavilion
 Football and Lacrosse — John Zinda Field
 Softball — Softball Field
 Soccer — John Pritzlaff Field
 Aquatics — Matt M. Axelrood Pool
 Tennis — Biszantz Family Tennis Center
 Track and Field — Burns Track Complex

Rivals
The other sports combination of the Claremont Colleges, and CMS' primary rival, is the team made up of Pomona College and Pitzer College known as the Pomona-Pitzer Sagehens (PP). This is known to students as the Sixth Street Rivalry.

Relations with Caltech
Mudders occasionally amused themselves by pranking Caltech. For example, in 1986, students from Mudd stole a memorial cannon from Fleming House at Caltech (originally from the National Guard) by dressing as maintenance people and carting it off on a flatbed truck for "cleaning". Harvey Mudd eventually returned the cannon after Caltech threatened to take legal action. In 2006, Massachusetts Institute of Technology (MIT) replicated the prank and moved the same cannon to their campus in Cambridge, Massachusetts.

Notable alumni

Notable Harvey Mudd College alumni include:

 Donald D. Chamberlin (1966), Co-inventor of SQL
 Richard H. Jones (1972), Diplomat, U.S. Ambassador to Israel
 Stan Love (1987), Astronaut
 George "Pinky" Nelson (1972), Astronaut
Sean “Day9” Plott, esports commentator and game designer

Notable faculty

See also 

 Association of Independent Technological Universities

References

Bibliography

External links

 
Website of The Student Life, the 5C newspaper
 Official athletics website
 

 
Claremont Colleges
Claremont, California
Universities and colleges in Los Angeles County, California
Liberal arts colleges in California
San Gabriel Valley
Schools accredited by the Western Association of Schools and Colleges
Educational institutions established in 1955
1955 establishments in California
Science and technology in Greater Los Angeles
Private universities and colleges in California